Territories in Movement (Territoires en mouvement, TeM) is a  centre-right political party in France founded in September 2011 by Jean-Christophe Fromantin, the mayor of Neuilly-sur-Seine. It was a member of the Union of Democrats and Independents. The movement presented candidates under the banner of 577 – The Independents of the Right and Centre (577 – Les Indépendants de la Droite et du Centre) in the 2017 legislative elections.

References

External links 
Official website

Political parties of the French Fifth Republic
Political parties established in 2011
Liberal parties in France